The Genesis Awards are awarded annually by the Humane Society of the United States (HSUS) to individuals in the major news and entertainment media for producing outstanding works which raise public awareness of animal issues. Presented by the HSUS Hollywood Outreach program, the awards show takes place every March in California. The awards have honored such well-known personalities as Michael Jackson, Aaron Sorkin, Anderson Cooper, Peter Gabriel, Ellen DeGeneres, Jane Goodall, David E. Kelley, Paul McCartney, Arthur Miller, Stephen Colbert, Oprah Winfrey, Prince, Jacques Cousteau and Ian Somerhalder, as well as journalists, film and documentary writers and producers, print and broadcast news outlets in the United States.

Honorary awards include the Sid Caesar Award for television comedy, the Doris Day Award for music, the Brigitte Bardot International Award for non-American media, and the Gretchen Wyler Award for a celebrity using their fame to bring attention to animal issues.

Founding
The Genesis Awards were founded as an annual event in 1986 by the Broadway actress and animal advocate Gretchen Wyler, under the aegis of the Fund for Animals. Wyler believed that rewarding members of the media encouraged them to spotlight more animal issues, thus increasing public awareness and compassion toward animals. The first event, a luncheon, drew 140 attendees, and in subsequent years it grew into a large gala averaging 800 guests.

In 1991, Wyler founded the Ark Trust, Inc., to present the Genesis Awards. Dr. Michael A. Giannelli (Ph.D. in clinical psychology; UCLA) served as the Founding Executive Director from 1991 through 1997. In 1990, it became a television special airing first on the Discovery Channel and then on Animal Planet. In August 2002, the Ark Trust joined with the Humane Society of the United States (HSUS). Wyler, as Vice President of HSUS Hollywood, continued her role as Chair of the event and Executive Producer of the Genesis Awards television special until her retirement in 2006.

Winner selection
Beginning with the first ceremony in 1986, Genesis Awards entries have been submitted by members of the public as well as by media professionals. Categories span television, film, print, radio, music, and the arts. The Genesis Awards Committee—via a process of submission, nomination, candidate selection, debate, and secret ballot—makes the final decisions regarding the winners. The 13 committee members are selected based on their personal histories in working for animal causes. The members include people from various animal-protection organizations and diverse walks of life.

Award ceremony
The Genesis Awards is the only event of its kind honoring the entertainment industry and news media for raising awareness of animal-protection issues. Celebrating the power of the news and entertainment media to shape and change societal attitudes for the good, Genesis Awards acknowledge outstanding works in TV, film, print and the arts.

Past Genesis Awards hosts include Betty White, William Shatner, Brooke Shields, Ellen DeGeneres, Ed Asner, Wendie Malick, Bill Maher, Scott Hamilton, Kevin Nealon, Bonnie Hunt, Charlotte Ross, Joely Fisher, David Hyde Pierce and Carrie Ann Inaba.

Presented at a star-studded ceremony, attracting leaders from the entertainment, news, and humane communities, Genesis Awards have featured such celebrity presenters as James Stewart, Jack Lemmon, Milton Berle, Christian Bale, Sidney Poitier, Carl Reiner, Daryl Hannah, Kristen Bell, Pierce Brosnan, James Cromwell, Zooey Deschanel, Emily Deschanel, Melanie Griffith, Teri Hatcher, Isabella Rossellini, Martin Sheen, Kaley Cuoco, Nicollette Sheridan, Alicia Silverstone, Kelsey Grammer, Deepak Chopra, Kim Cattrall, Peter Falk, Walter Matthau, and Kermit the Frog. The Genesis Awards is taped for broadcast.

The awards ceremony has been held at both the Beverly Hilton Hotel in Beverly Hills and the Century Plaza Hotel in Century City. Through the years it has aired on the Discovery Channel, American Life Network and Animal Planet.

Sponsors for the Genesis Awards have included Warner Bros., Gardein, One Car One Difference, Honda, Bank of America, HBO, Market Development Group Incorporated and more.

Past winners

1986 Genesis Awards
Magnum, P.I. – Best TV Drama Series
Night Court – Best TV Comedy Series
1987 Genesis Awards
Harry and the Hendersons – Best Feature Film – Comedy
Star Trek IV: The Voyage Home – Best Feature Film – Adventure
Benji the Hunted – Best Feature Film – Family
Gimme a Break! – Best TV Comedy Series
1988 Genesis Awards
Hachi-ko – Best Feature Film
 Highway to Heaven – Best TV Drama Series
 The Doris Day Music Award – Michael Jackson, "Man in the Mirror" (music video)
 Classic Film Award – Bambi
 Lifetime Achievement Award – Jacques Cousteau
1990 Genesis Awards
 Gorillas in the Mist – Best Feature Film
 The Bear – Best Foreign Film
 Life Goes On – Best TV Drama Series
 Punky Brewster – Best TV Comedy Series
 Classic Film Award – Born Free
1991 Genesis Awards
The Rescuers Down Under – Best Feature Film
MacGyver – Best TV Drama Series

1992 Genesis Awards
City Slickers – Best Feature Film
 White Fang – Best Feature Film – Family
Designing Women; "The Fur Flies" – Best TV Comedy Series
Dinosaurs – Best Family TV Series

1993 Genesis Awards  
 Beethoven – Best Feature Film
 FernGully: The Last Rainforest – Best Animated Feature Film
 The Simpsons; "Dog of Death" – Best TV Comedy Series
Quantum Leap – Best TV Drama Series
The New Lassie – Best Family TV Series
 The Doris Day Music Award – Megadeth, "Countdown to Extinction"
 Classic Film Award – The Misfits
1994 Genesis Awards
Free Willy – Best Feature Film
Sisters – Best TV Drama Series
Roseanne; "Lanford Daze" – Best TV Comedy Series
Rescue 911 – Best Reality Series
 The Doris Day Music Award – Paul McCartney, "Looking for Changes"
 Classic Film Award – Bless the Beasts and Children
 Lifetime Achievement Award – Jane Goodall
1995 Genesis Awards
Black Beauty – Best Feature Film
 The Golden Palace – Best TV Comedy Series
Dead at 21 – Best TV Drama Series
1996 Genesis Awards
Babe – Best Feature Film
 The Simpsons; "Lisa the Vegetarian" – Best TV Comedy Series
Dr. Quinn, Medicine Woman – Best TV Drama Series
 The Doris Day Music Award – Michael Jackson, "Earth Song"
1997 Genesis Awards
 Fly Away Home – Best Feature Film
 Ellen – Best TV Comedy Series
 Baywatch – Best TV Drama Series
 The Doris Day Music Award – Crosby & Nash, "To the Last Whale"
 A special Genesis Award was given to Dr. Michael A. Giannelli (Founding Executive Director, 1991-1997): "In Appreciation of Your Words, Your Wisdom and for Helping Develop the Soul of the Ark Trust"
1998 Genesis Awards
Shiloh – Best Feature Film
 Everybody Loves Raymond – Best TV Comedy Series
 Millennium; "Broken World" – Best TV Drama Series
1999 Genesis Awards
 Mighty Joe Young – Best Feature Film
 The Practice; "The Food Chain" – Best TV Drama Series
 Sports Night – Best New TV Series
Leeza – Best Talk Show
Wild Rescues – Best Reality Series
2000 Genesis Awards
Instinct – Best Feature Film
 The Iron Giant – Best Animated Feature Film
 Spin City; "The Deer Hunter" – Best TV Comedy Series
Judging Amy; "The Persistence of Tectonics" – Best TV Drama Series
 Leeza – Best Talk Show
 Road Rules: Semester at Sea – Best Reality Series
 The Dolly Green Special Achievement Award – Prince, "Rave Un2 the Joy Fantastic" (liner notes)
2001 Genesis Awards
Chicken Run – Best Feature Film
 Popular; "Joe Loves Mary Cherry" – Best TV Comedy Series
 Family Law; "Family Values" – Best TV Drama Series
 Politically Incorrect – Best Talk Show

2002 Genesis Awards
 Dr. Dolittle 2 – Best Feature Film
 Dharma & Greg; "A Fish Tale" – Best TV Comedy Series
 Law & Order; "Whose Monkey Is It Anyway" – Best TV Drama Series
Wild Rescues – Best Reality Series
 The Doris Day Music Award – Claude Carmichael & Pete Wasner, "Bearly Hangin' On"
2003 Genesis Awards
Spirit: Stallion of the Cimarron – Best Feature Film
 8 Simple Rules; "Goodbye" – Best TV Comedy Series
 The Practice; "Small Sacrifices" and Everwood; "Deer God" (tie) – Best TV Drama Series
 Within These Walls – Best TV Movie
Animal Precinct – Best Reality Series
 The Doris Day Music Award – Peter Gabriel, "Animal Nation"
2004 Genesis Awards Winners
Legally Blonde 2: Red, White & Blonde – Best Feature Film
Finding Nemo – Best Animated Feature Film
 Everybody Loves Raymond; "The Bird" – Best TV Comedy Series
Animal Cops: Detroit – Best Reality Series
 The Classic Music Award – Matt Monro, "Born Free"
2005 Genesis Awards Winners
 Two Brothers – Best Feature Film
 Benji: Off the Leash! – Best Feature Film – Family
 The Corporation – Best Documentary Feature
 8 Simple Rules; "Finale: Part Deux" – Sid Caesar Comedy Award (formerly called Best TV Comedy Series)
 Huff; "Is She Dead?" – Best TV Drama Series
Cell Dogs – Best Reality Series
 The Montel Williams Show – Best Talk Show
Best Friend Forgotten – Best TV Documentary
2006 Genesis Awards
An Unfinished Life – Best Feature Film
 Duma – Best Feature Film – Family
 Wallace & Gromit: The Curse of the Were-Rabbit – Best Animated Feature Film
 The Wild Parrots of Telegraph Hill – Best Documentary Feature
 CSI: Crime Scene Investigation – Best TV Drama Series
 Larry King Live – Best Talk Show
Animal Cops: Houston – Best Reality Series
The Doris Day Music Award – Nellie McKay, "The Dog Song"
2007 Genesis Awards
Fast Food Nation – Best Feature Film
Charlotte's Web – Best Feature Film – Family
Happy Feet – Best Animated Feature Film
The Simpsons; "Million Dollar Abie" – Sid Caesar Comedy Award
Bones; "The Woman in Limbo" – Best TV Drama Series
 Extreme Makeover: Home Edition; "The DeAlea Family" – Best Reality Series
Avatar: The Last Airbender; "Appa's Lost Days" – Outstanding Children's Programming
 The Gretchen Wyler Award – Sir Paul McCartney
2008 Genesis Awards
Year of the Dog – Best Feature Film
According to Jim – Sid Caesar Comedy Award
CSI: Crime Scene Investigation; "Unbearable" – Best TV Drama Series
 Planet in Peril – Best TV Documentary
 The Gretchen Wyler Award – Hayden Panettiere
2009 Genesis Awards
Bolt – Best Feature Film
Sharkwater – Best Documentary Feature
The Simpsons; "Apocalypse Cow" – Sid Caesar Comedy Award
Grey's Anatomy; "Life During Wartime" – Best TV Drama Series
30 Days; "Animal Rights" – Best Reality Seriesx
Planet in Peril – Best TV Documentary
 The Gretchen Wyler Award – Ellen DeGeneres & Portia de Rossi
2010 Genesis Awards
Hotel for Dogs and Up (tie) – Best Feature Film
The Cove – Best Documentary Feature
Family Guy; "Dog Gone" – Sid Caesar Comedy Award
Bones; "The Tough Man in the Tender Chicken" – Best TV Drama Series
The Ellen DeGeneres Show – Best Talk Show
Whale Wars – Best Reality Series
Death on a Factory Farm – Best TV Documentary
Lifetime Achievement Award – Tippi Hedren
2011 Genesis Awards
How to Train Your Dragon – Best Feature Film
The Elephant in the Living Room – Best Documentary Feature
The Colbert Report – Sid Caesar Comedy Award
True Blood; "Hitting the Ground" – Best TV Drama Series
The Oprah Winfrey Show – Best Talk Show
Last Chance Highway – Best Reality Series
My Child is a Monkey – Best TV Documentary
The Gretchen Wyler Award – Kristin Davis
2012 Genesis Awards
Rise of the Planet of the Apes – Best Feature Film
Born to Be Wild 3D – Best Documentary Feature
The Colbert Report – Sid Caesar Comedy Award
Hawaii Five-0; "Lapa'au" – Best TV Drama Series
The Ellen DeGeneres Show – Best Talk Show
Animal Planet Investigates; "Captive Hunting Exposed" – Best Reality Series
Gordon Ramsay: Shark Bait – Best TV Documentary
20/20 – Best TV Newsmagazine
International Humanitarian Award – Pritish Nandy
The Gretchen Wyler Award – Ian Somerhalder
2013 Genesis Awards
Big Miracle – Best Feature Film
The Colbert Report, Representative Steve King on dogfighting – Sid Caesar Comedy Award
Harry's Law, "Gorilla My Dreams" – Best TV Drama Series
Ivory Wars – Best TV Documentary
Wild Justice – Reality Series
60 Minutes, "Jungle Warfare", Nine Network Australia – Brigitte Bardot International TV
 The Gretchen Wyler Award – Ke$ha
2018 Genesis Awards

 Okja; Megan Leavey - Outstanding Feature Film
 Sled Dogs; The Last Pig - Outstanding Documentary Film
 The Simpsons - Sid Caesar Comedy Award
 ABC News Hotline, "Giraffes: A Silent Extinction"; "Blood Horns" - Outstanding National TV News Magazine
 Univision Network News, "Harvey, the Dog Who Survived the Hurricane" - Outstanding National TV News Feature
 FOX 28/ABC6, Columbus, Ohio, "12 Ohio Puppy Mills on Humane Society's List of the 'Horrible Hundred'" - Outstanding Local News Feature
 FOX 31 KDVR-TV Denver, Colorado, "Cyanide Bombs"; "Unsanctioned Horse Racing Exposed"; KING 5 News Seattle, Washington, "Hound Hunting for Bears Continues Despite Ban" - Outstanding Local News Series
 FOX 40 Sacramento, Studio 40 Live, "Meat-less Memorial Day" - Outstanding Daytime Show
 Mission Critical: Orangutan on the Edge; War Dog: A Soldier's Best Friend - Outstanding TV Documentary
 Dian Fossey: Secrets in the Mist - Outstanding TV Documentary Series
 The Loud House "Frog Wild" - Outstanding Children's Programming
 NPR Weekend Edition, Simon Says, "Arcade Hunting: No Tribute to the Great Outdoors" - Outstanding Radio
 Natasha Daly - Reporter of the Year
 TIME, "The Future of Zoos: Challenges Force Zoos to Change in Big Ways"; TIME Special Edition, "The Animal Mind: How They Think, How They Feel, How to Understand Them" - Outstanding Magazine Feature
 Chicago Tribune, "Trump Should Keep the Ban on Elephant Trophies"; "A Smart Reprieve for Great Lakes Wolves"; "Memo to the West: When You Hunt Grizzlies and Wolves, You Lose Midwest Tourists"; Los Angeles Times, "There's a Grim Reality Behind Your Thanksgiving Turkey"; USA Today, "A Christmas Puppy: The Tale of Animal Welfare" - Outstanding Editorial
 The Washington Post Sports Columnist: Norman Chad "Animal Cruelty has given me a change of heart on animals used in sporting competition" - Outstanding Commentary
 Business of Fashion, Multiple Articles; National Geographic Wildlife Watch, "Months After Raid on Infamous Tiger Temple, Plans for Off-Shoot Zoo Forge Ahead" - Outstanding Online
 The Guardian, Exclusive Footage Shows Elephants Being Captured in Zimbabwe for Chinese Zoos; The Observer, Africa's New Elite Force: Women Gunning for Poachers and Fighting for a Better Life - Brigitte Bardot International Print/Online
 Univision Network Facebook "To Eat or Not Eat Meat?" - Social Media

See also

 List of American television awards

References

External links
Genesis Awards
HSUS Hollywood Outreach 
The Humane Society of the United States

American television awards
Animal welfare organizations based in the United States
Awards established in 1986
1986 establishments in the United States